William Cain (17 December 1899 – 24 December 1981) was an Australian cricketer. He played in three first-class matches for Queensland in 1924/25.

See also
 List of Queensland first-class cricketers

References

External links
 

1899 births
1981 deaths
Australian cricketers
Queensland cricketers
Cricketers from Brisbane